Flug is a surname. Notable people with the surname include: 

Karnit Flug (born 1955), Polish-born Israeli economist and government official
Noach Flug (1925–2011), Israeli economist and diplomat
Vasily Flug (1860–1955), Russian army general